George Woodroffe (1625 - 1688) was an English politician for a Surrey constituency in the late seventeenth century.

Woodroffe was born at Poyle in Stanwell and educated at Christ Church, Oxford. He was High Sheriff of Surrey in 1668 and was knighted on 19 May 1681. Woodroffe sat as M.P. for Haslemere from 1681 to 1687. He died on 6 December that year.

His son also sat as MP for Haslemere.

Notes

People from Stanwell
1625 births
1688 deaths
Alumni of Christ Church, Oxford
17th-century English people
English MPs 1681
English MPs 1685–1687
High Sheriffs of Surrey
English knights